The Uist & Barra Amateur Football Association (PAFA) is a football (soccer) league competition for amateur clubs in Uist and Barra in the Hebrides of northwestern Scotland.  The association is affiliated to the Scottish Amateur Football Association. Teams in this division also take part in the  Highland Amateur Cup and in the Co-op Cup along with clubs from the Lewis & Harris Football Association. Like several other Highland and island leagues, fixtures are played over summer rather than the traditional winter calendar.

The association is composed of a single division of six clubs.

League Membership
In order to join the association, clubs need to apply and are then voted in by current member clubs.

2022 league members

Uist & Barra League

Benbecula
Southend
Iochdar Saints
North Uist
Eriskay
Barra

External links
Uist & Barra AFA League Website

Football leagues in Scotland
Football in the Outer Hebrides
Organisations based in the Outer Hebrides
Football governing bodies in Scotland
Amateur association football in Scotland